Balch Glacier is a glacier  long, on the east coast of Graham Land, flowing southeast into Mill Inlet, to the south of Gould Glacier.

History
It was first surveyed by the Falkland Islands Dependencies Survey in 1946–47, and named "East Balch Glacier". With "West Balch Glacier" it was reported to fill a transverse depression across Graham Land, but further survey in 1957 showed that there is no close topographical alignment between the two. The name "Balch", for Edwin S. Balch, an American Antarctic historian, has been limited to this glacier and an entirely new name, Drummond Glacier, approved for the west glacier.

See also
 List of glaciers in the Antarctic
 Glaciology

References 

Glaciers of Graham Land
Foyn Coast